The UK Rock & Metal Singles Chart is a record chart which ranks the best-selling rock and heavy metal songs in the United Kingdom. Compiled and published by the Official Charts Company, the data is based on each track's weekly physical sales, digital downloads and streams. In 1996, there were 30 singles that topped the 52 published charts. The first number-one single of the year was "When Love & Hate Collide", the only single from the Def Leppard compilation Vault: Def Leppard Greatest Hits (1980–1995). The final number-one single of the year was "In the Meantime", the debut single by alternative rock band Spacehog.

The most successful songs on the UK Rock & Metal Singles Chart in 1996 were "Hero of the Day" by Metallica and "Let's Make a Night to Remember" by Bryan Adams, both of which spent five weeks atop the chart. Metallica also spent two weeks at number one with "Until It Sleeps" and one with "Mama Said", while Adams also topped the chart with "The Only Thing That Looks Good on Me Is You". Sepultura spent five weeks at number one with three songs; Def Leppard spent four weeks at number one with four songs; and Bon Jovi spent four weeks at number one with two songs. Songs by Dog Eat Dog, Sex Pistols and The Presidents of the United States of America each spent three weeks at number one; while Whale, Rage Against the Machine, Terrorvision and Soundgarden all spent two weeks atop the chart.

Chart history

See also
1996 in British music
List of UK Rock & Metal Albums Chart number ones of 1996

References

External links
Official UK Rock & Metal Singles Chart Top 40 at the Official Charts Company
The Official UK Top 40 Rock Singles at BBC Radio 1

1996 in British music
United Kingdom Rock and Metal Singles
1996